Ossian Cole Simonds (November 11, 1855 – November 20, 1931), often known as O. C. Simonds, was an American landscape designer. He preferred the term 'landscape gardener' to that of 'landscape architect'.  A number of Simonds' works are listed on the U.S. National Register of Historic Places (NRHP).

Early life and education
Simonds was born in Grand Rapids, Michigan on November 11, 1855 where he developed a love of nature through his explorations of its woods. From 1874-1878, he studied civil engineering at the University of Michigan and, briefly, architecture with William Le Baron Jenney.

Career
In 1878, Simonds joined Jenney's architectural practice in Chicago. His first project was Graceland Cemetery where he learned naturalistic English-style landscape design. Through Jenney's tutelage, he learned how to use native plants in landscape design, an unusual practice at the time. He studied local woods, hydrology, and topography leading him to be credited with the creation of the Prairie Style along with Jens Jensen, and Walter Burley Griffin. In 1880, Graceland was increasingly deferring to Simonds about the amount of work and money required to develop the property's eastern section before Jenney which led to ending Jenney's involvement in the project. This led to Simonds establishing the firm of Holabird & Simonds to carry out the work. In 1881, Martin Roche, who had also worked in Jenney's office, joined them as a third partner. In 1883, Simonds left the firm to concentrate solely to become the superintendent at Graceland. His work at Graceland led him to be called the "dean of cemetery design." In 1897, he left his position at Graceland but continued to be their landscape consultant for the rest of his career. In 1900, the cemetery was awarded a silver medal at the Exposition Universelle in Paris for its landscape and later a Medal of Honor by the Architectural League of New York in 1925.

In 1888, Ossian Cole Simonds' first project after Graceland was to create a site plan for Fort Sheridan which was to include a parade ground for drills. Simonds used a natural ravine to boarder the meadow created for the purpose. A scenic drive was incorporated into the plan which showcased natural vistas and brick and stone officers' housing. The effect of the plan was lauded as picturesque and charming.

In 1899, he was a founding member of the American Society of Landscape Architects, and served as its president in 1913.

In 1903, Simonds formed Simonds and Company and was awarded the redesign and extension of Chicago's Lincoln Park with Bryan Lathrop and Francis T. Simmons. The plan was to double the parks 275 acres by extending it into Lake Michigan and later extended it north approximately 1,000 acres. To update the older sections, he incorporated winding pathways and facilities so as not to compromise the landscape. He relied on natural topography to create naturalistic "rooms" and scenic meadow vistas. He also designed golf courses, Belle Meade, city parks, town plans, universities including Iowa State and the University of Maryland, residences, and private estates around the country.

In 1920, Simonds authored Landscape Gardening. In the book, he lays out his approach to landscape design which looks to nature to inform the design. This included the use of native plants, the use of greenways, and warning of urban sprawl. He also founded the Chair of Landscape Design at the University of Michigan (U of M). In 1929, he was honored with a master's of arts from U of M.

In 1922, Simonds designed the grounds of the Morton Arboretum in Lisle, Illinois.

Simonds died November 20, 1931 after an extended illness in Chicago.

Landscape design

Cummer Gardens, 829 Riverside Ave. Jacksonville, FL Simonds, Ossian Cole, NRHP-listed
Lake Forest Cemetery, 1525 N. Lake Rd. Lake Forest, IL Simonds, Ossian Cole, NRHP-listed
Library Park, 711 59th Place Kenosha, WI Simonds, Ossian Cole, NRHP-listed
Lincoln Park, 2045 Lincoln Park W. Chicago, IL Simonds, Ossian Cole, NRHP-listed
Riverview Park, 2000 Harrison Hill Hannibal, MO Simonds, Ossian Cole, NRHP-listed
Sharon Cemetery, County Road J40 Farmington, IA, Simonds, O.C., NRHP-listed
Tenney Park-Yahara River Parkway, 1220 E. Johnson St.; 501 S. Thornton Ave. Madison, WI Simonds, Ossian Cole, NRHP-listed
Washington Park, Bounded by Fayette Ave., Williams Blvd., Walnut St., MacArthur Blvd., S. Grand Ave. and Chatham Rd. Springfield, IL Simonds, Ossian Cole, NRHP-listed
Hill House, Mill Neck, NY, Residence of Anton Gysberti Hodenpyl
Cedar Bend Nature Area, 1495 Cedar Bend Dr, Ann Arbor, MI 48109
John Henes Park, 201 Henes Park Drive, Menominee, MI 49858
Brucemore, a site of the National Trust for Historic Preservation, 2160 Linden Dr. SE, Cedar Rapids, IA 52403
Pier Cove Ravine, a nature reserve on the shores of Lake Michigan, south of Saugatuck, MI and west of Fennville, MI, at approximately 2308 Lakeshore Dr, Fennville, MI 49408
Morton Arboretum, 4100 Illinois Route 53 Lisle, IL 60532 https://acorn.mortonarb.org/Detail/entities/1502

References

Further reading
 Mara Geldbloom, Ossian Simonds: Prairie Spirit in Landscape Gardening, in: The Prairie School Review 12, 2 (1975).
 Robert E. Grese, Ossian Cole Simonds, in: William H. Tishler (Ed.), American Landscape Architecture. Designers and Places, Washington, D. C., Preservation Press 1989.
 Julia Sniderman Bachrach, Ossian Cole Simonds: Conservation Ethic in the Prairie Style, in: William H. Tishler (Ed.), Midwestern Landscape Architecture, University of Illinois 2000.

 Geiger, Barbara, Low-Key Genius: The Life and Work of Landscape-Gardener O.C. Simonds, Ferme Ornee 2011

American landscape and garden designers
American garden writers
American male non-fiction writers
1855 births
1931 deaths
Artists from Grand Rapids, Michigan
University of Michigan College of Engineering alumni
20th-century American male writers
20th-century American non-fiction writers